Anahim Lake Airport  is located  south of Anahim Lake, British Columbia, Canada. It is a year-round airport serving the West Chilcotin area, operated by Cariboo Regional District.

The airport has a  paved strip and airport services for those who own or operate their own aircraft.

Airlines and destinations

References

Certified airports in British Columbia
Cariboo Regional District